The Islamic advertisement  Organization (Persian: سازمان تبلیغات اسلامی ایران) is an Iranian religious and cultural organization. It was created by Rouhollah Khomeini after the 1979 Revolution in Iran, and is under the supervision of the Supreme Leader. This organization was originally created in the summer of 1982 to promote the ideologies of the Islamic Republic.

History 
It was formed after the revolution based on the decree of the 1st Supreme Leader, Ruhollah Khomeini. in 1981. The Organization is an independent legal entity managed by the supreme leader of Iran.

Name 
The initial name of the Islamic Development Organization was "The Institution of Islamic Development Council" (Persian: نهاد شورای عالی تبلیغات اسلامی). This was later changed to "Islamic Development Organization" on 3r April 1989.

Chiefs 

Ahmad Jannati was the first chief. He was succeeded by Mahmoud Mohammadi Araghi for ten years, followed by Seyyed Mahdi Khamoushi and Mohammad Qomi.

Goals 
The goals of the Organization are:

 Revive and promote Islam in all needed fields, and develop Islamic ethics between people, particularly youth.
 Defend the principles of Islam, Islamic republic system, and Islamic revolution aims.
 Quantitative and qualitative development of religious promotion.

Dependent organizations 
 Soore University
 Mehr News Agency
 The Artistic Sect
 Research Institute for Islamic Promotion and Studies, Baqir al-Uloom
 Darol-Quran al-Karim Organization
 Tebyan Cultural Institute
 Amirkabir (publisher)
 Ketab Shahr Company
 Tehran Times English-language newspaper
 Organization of Islamic Education Schools

ِDuties 

21 duties were approved by the board of trustees, including:

 Policy making, planning, guidance, organizing, supporting, and supervising public religious promotion.
 Revival and development of Shia education, culture and history.
 Surveying  "misleading advertising," and "cultural invasion" from political opponents.
 Co-operation within ministries, governmental organizations (and other related institutions) in order to develop Islamic education and culture.
 Founding of information centers in specialty, promotion and religious fields.

See also 
 Soore University
 Mehr News Agency
 Tebyan Cultural Institute
 Amirkabir (publisher)
 Tehran Times English-language newspaper
 Islamic Culture and Communication Organization
 Islamic Development Coordination Council
 Housing Foundation of Islamic Revolution

References

External link 
 Islamic Development Organization (of Iran)

Organisations of the Iranian Revolution
Islamic organisations based in Iran
Iranian propaganda organisations
Revolutionary institutions of the Islamic Republic of Iran